Miss America 1923, the third Miss America pageant, was held at the Million Dollar Pier in Atlantic City, New Jersey on Friday, September 7, 1923. The incumbent, 17-year-old Mary Katherine Campbell, retained her title due primarily to her victory in the bathing suit competition exhibiting "an almost perfect figure."

Campbell is the only Miss America to win the title twice. She stated that she was very surprised to have won and was rooting for one of the other girls to win. Joseph Cummings Chase, a judge at the pageant said, "Miss Campbell is possessed of great vivacity and an inherent shyness that constitute a wonderful combination. She is typically American and altogether an ideal type."

Overview

Organization of pageant
The pageant consisted of four phases of competition: evening dress (called King Neptune's Court); roller chair parade, bathing girl revue, and the final. There was no talent competition at this pageant (this would not become part of the Miss America competition until 1935).

Judges
The panel of judges for the national pageant included film director, Penrhyn Stanlaws; painter, Joseph Cummings Chase; glamour artist, J. Knowles Hare; illustrator, Dean Cornwell; and painter and illustrator, Norman Rockwell.

Aftermath
Soon after the conclusion of the pageant, numerous women clubs and church groups protested against any further beauty contests and, "[urged] that they be prohibited by law," and, "[denounced them] as vulgar, undignified 'and demoralizing to young womanhood." One woman was quoted saying, " 'The beauty of our girls is too glorious, too sacred a thing to be put on exhibition like the freaks in a circus side show, to be commercialized and made the basis for all sorts of mercenary schemes.' "

Another protest arose when Ethelda Kenvin, Miss Brooklyn, was named the 1st runner-up at the conclusion of the contest despite being married since 1921 to professional baseball player Eppie Barnes. Some of her fellow contestants insisted that her placement and awards be revoked due to her marital status and violations of eligibility rules. The judges' panel were made aware of this but ultimately decided to allow Kenvin to keep her prizes.

Additionally, Helmar Liederman of New York filed suit against the contest directors, Armand T. Nichols and Harry L. Godshall, Sr., for $150,000 due to their refusal to allow her to enter the national competition as "Miss Alaska" because she was a married woman, despite being authorized to compete by a newspaper in Juneau, Alaska.

Results

Placements

Awards

Evening Dress Award
Award also referred to as "King Neptune's Court."

Roller Chair Parade

Contestants

References

Secondary sources

External links
 Miss America official website

1923
1923 in the United States
1923 in New Jersey
September 1923 events
Events in Atlantic City, New Jersey